Oxynoticeras is an extinct genus of ammonite from the Early Jurassic of Europe and North America. This genus is characterized by its smooth shell, with almost invisible undulations on the flank, and a sharp keel.

Synonym Oxynotoceras was created by Buckman as misspelling.

Distribution
Fossils belonging to this genus were found in Europe, Morocco, Asia, Canada, USA and South America.

References

Oxynoticeratidae
Ammonitida genera
Early Jurassic ammonites of South America
Early Jurassic ammonites of Asia
Early Jurassic ammonites of Africa
Early Jurassic ammonites of Europe
Early Jurassic ammonites of North America
Sinemurian life